Kafr Safra (also spelled Kafar Safra) is a village in northern Syria, administratively part of the Afrin District of the Aleppo Governorate, located northwest of Aleppo. Nearby localities include Shaykh al-Hadid to the north, Qarah Bash to the east and Jindires to the south. According to the Syria Central Bureau of Statistics (CBS), Kafr Safra had a population of 2,150 in the 2004 census. The town eventually came under the control of the Syrian National Army on March 9, 2018.

References

Populated places in Afrin District
Kurdish communities in Syria
Towns in Aleppo Governorate